Dylan Thomas Lewis (also known as DiRK ViLE) is an Australian television and radio host.

Biography

Early life
Lewis was educated at Caulfield Grammar School and graduated in 1990; he then studied a Bachelor of Education in Drama and Music degree at the University of Melbourne. John Bannon, former South Australian premier, was Lewis's stepfather.

Career

Television
Lewis has undertaken several roles hosting and presenting for numerous Australian music programs; his quick rise to fame started was while he was a host on ABC TV's national Saturday-morning live music show Recovery (from 1996 until the show's run finished in April 2000). The year 2000 saw Lewis presenting a national television program, The 10:30 Slot, and Pepsi Live, a music chart television program.

Lewis won Celebrity Big Brother in 2002 and was a contestant on Celebrity Circus in 2005.

In 2010, he was appointed host of Video Hits on Network Ten. He stayed on the show until its cancellation in mid-2011.

In January 2022, Lewis won the eighth season of I'm a Celebrity...Get Me Out of Here!.

Radio
In September 2006, Lewis signed with Nova 100 where he was music presenter in mornings for four years then moved to afternoons until November 2012. , he co-hosted the Lewis & Lowe breakfast show on Nova 91.9 in Adelaide with Shane Lowe, later joined by, then replaced by Hayley Pearson as the Dylan & Hayley breakfast show (until 2019). He previously worked as a radio announcer for the Austereo Network and Triple J. He has won three Australian Commercial Radio Awards (ACRAs): "Best Newcomer" in 2007, "Best Music Personality" in 2009 and most recently for "Best Music Presenter" in 2012.

In 2020, Lewis re-joined the ABC hosted the weekend Double J mornings until the end of 2021.

Music
Lewis was the lead vocalist and played harmonica for funk/alternative rock band The Brown Hornet, and was later involved in a hip-hop project under the name Megabias. More recently, he has sung in a Melbourne-based group called Manchoir and the children's band The Haploids.

Film
Lewis had a role in the Australian film The Real Thing (2002), and has played the lead role in three short films: Like It Is, Ray (2004) and The Postman (2007). He was also an extra in Star Wars: Episode II – Attack of the Clones.

He has a cameo in the Australian film "EMO the Musical" (2016) as Doug Skeleton.

Personal life
Lewis is married to Hollie, with whom he has a daughter and son.

Lewis had a brother, Quinn, three years younger, who died in 2006.

See also
 List of Caulfield Grammar School people

References

External links
 
 
 Lewis & Lowe at Nova 919

People educated at Caulfield Grammar School
Living people
University of Melbourne alumni
Big Brother (Australian TV series) contestants
Reality show winners
Australian music critics
Australian music journalists
1973 births
Big Brother (franchise) winners
I'm a Celebrity...Get Me Out of Here! (Australian TV series) participants